The 1917–18 Army Cadets men's basketball team represented United States Military Academy during the 1917–18 college men's basketball season. The head coach was Ivens Jones, coaching his second season with the Cadets. The team captains were William Gernhardt and Leo Kreber.

Schedule

|-

References

Army Black Knights men's basketball seasons
Army
Army Cadets Men's Basketball Team
Army Cadets Men's Basketball Team